Sung Hoon (born Bang In-gyu on February 14, 1983) is a South Korean actor and a model.

Early life
Sung Hoon's birth name is Bang In-gyu but he legally changed his name to Bang Sung-hoon because since little, he was often sick and had so many surgeries. He revealed the reason thru variety show I Live Alone in episode 312. He was a swimming champion in his University and specialised in butterfly stroke. He swam for 14 years but had to quit because of a spinal injury. He then enlisted into the military, but the same injury sent him home early. 
Sung Hoon then went on and became a swimming trainer. He debuted as an actor in 2009 with White Brown's Because I Love You.

Career

2011–2012: First acting roles and commercial success
Sung Hoon's breakthrough role was in the supernatural romance drama, New Tales of Gisaeng. His performance in this drama earned him a New Star Award at 2011 SBS Drama Awards.

In 2012, he was cast in his first Chinese drama, The Bodyguard. The same year, he featured in historical drama Faith, playing an antagonist role. Later that year, he was cast in the daily drama, The Birth of a Family.

2013–2015:  Acting setback and return to television 
In 2013, Sung Hoon starred as the lead role in the weekend drama, Passionate Love. In 2014, Sung Hoon starred in the web drama 6 Persons Room, where he played a construction safety engineer who suffers an injury and finds himself in a hospital surrounded by strange patients.

In 2015, Sung Hoon starred in the web drama Noble, My Love, and featured in KBS's romantic comedy series Oh My Venus playing a professional MMA fighter.

Sung Hoon is also a musical Disc jockey, and conducts DJ activities under the name Roiii. Sung Hoon has performed in various countries such as China, Hong Kong, Thailand, Malaysia, Singapore and Indonesia.

2016–2017: Rising Popularity 
In 2016, Sung Hoon returned to the Korean small screen with KBS's weekend drama Five Enough, playing a model turned professional golfer, where his pairing with Shin Hye-sun gained popularity among the viewers.

In 2017, Sung Hoon starred in the romantic comedy drama My Secret Romance, in which he played a second-generation chaebol. He then played an entertainment company producer in The Idolmaster KR, which is based on The Idolmaster Japanese video game. The same year, Sung Hoon was cast in the romance-fantasy film Are You in Love? opposite Kim So-eun. The film premiered in 2020.

2018–present: Resurgence and comeback to television
In 2018, Sung Hoon's debut action film Brothers in Heaven was released in January. He acted alongside Jo Han-sun as fraternal twins. He was also cast in the sitcom, The Sound of Your Heart: Reboot, as well as the romantic comedy web drama I Picked Up a Celebrity on the Street. 

In 2019, Sung Hoon returned to small screen with the romantic comedy drama Level Up playing a character of a company restructuring expert.

By end of 2020, Sung Hoon returned to web drama with My Secret Star playing a character of a Hallyu star who is hiding a big secret and meets an entertainment journalist who risked her life to get on the scoop, played by Vietnamese actress Hoàng Yến Chibi.

In 2021, Sung Hoon starred as a lawyer who have trouble in maintaining his marriage in season 1 & 2 drama Love (ft. Marriage and Divorce). In 2022, he played the role of Raphael in the SBS romantic comedy drama Woori the Virgin based on American series Jane the Virgin, reuniting with New Tales of Gisaeng co-star Im Soo-hyang.

Filmography

Film

Television series

Web series

Television shows

Hosting

Music video

Musical theater

Discography

Singles

Ambassadorship
 2019 - Honorary Ambassador for 18th FINA World Championships Gwangju 2019 
 2021 - Daegu City's Public Relations Ambassador

Awards and nominations

References

External links
 
 

South Korean male models
1983 births
Living people
People from Daegu
21st-century South Korean male actors
South Korean male television actors
South Korean male film actors
South Korean male voice actors
South Korean male web series actors
Yong In University alumni